Philip Venables (born 1979) is a British composer best known for his operatic and theatrical works with themes of sexuality, violence and politics.

Life and career 

Born in Chester, Venables studied at Jesus College, Cambridge and the Royal Academy of Music, where he studied under Philip Cashian and was awarded the DipRAM diploma and the Manson Fellowship in Composition.

Venables' orchestral works include Arc, written for the BBC Philharmonic; String Quartet for the Duke Quartet at Wigmore Hall; Hyaline, for the London Symphony Orchestra; and The Revenge of Miguel Cotto for the London Sinfonietta. His operatic and vocal works include In America et ego, performed at the Bregenz Festival; UNLEASHED, for the Grimeborn Festival; and Thalidomide for the BBC Singers. His artistic collaborations have included Bound to Hurt, with Turner Prize winner Douglas Gordon; and Illusions, with avant-garde cabaret artist David Hoyle.

Venables wrote the 2016 operatic adaptation of 4.48 Psychosis by Sarah Kane for the Royal Opera at the Lyric Hammersmith. Authorised by Kane's estate as the first operatic adaptation of her work, the opera was well received by critics and nominated for the 2017 Olivier Award for Best New Opera Production.

Venables is the Doctoral Composer in Residence at the Royal Opera House and Guildhall School of Music and Drama. In 2016, he became an Associate of the Royal Academy of Music.

Venables identifies as queer and many of his works touch on LGBT culture. He lives in London and Berlin.

Works

References

External links 

 

1979 births
21st-century classical composers
21st-century British male musicians
Alumni of Jesus College, Cambridge
Alumni of the Royal Academy of Music
British classical composers
British opera composers
LGBT classical composers
English LGBT musicians
Living people
MacDowell Colony fellows
Male opera composers
People from Chester
Queer artists
Royal Opera House